Joffrey Lauvergne (born 30 September 1991) is a French professional basketball player for ASVEL of the French LNB Pro A and the EuroLeague. He was drafted 55th overall by the Memphis Grizzlies in the 2013 NBA draft, who then traded his rights to the Denver Nuggets.

Professional career

Élan Chalon (2009–2012)
After two years in INSEP (2007–2009), Joffrey Lauvergne arrived in Chalon-sur-Saône in 2009. With Élan Chalon he won a French League in 2012, two French Cups in 2011 and 2012, and Leaders Cup in 2012. Lauvergne averaged 5.4 points and 3.4 rebounds per game in the French League. He was waived by the team on 25 November 2012.

Valencia (2012)
On 28 November 2012 Lauvergne signed a short-term deal with the ACB club Valencia. He averaged 5.8 points and 3.8 rebounds per game in five matches.

Partizan (2012–2014)
On 28 December 2012 Lauvergne signed a two and half year contract with Partizan Belgrade. After breakthrough half-season he was having in Partizan, he was drafted 55th overall by the Memphis Grizzlies in the 2013 NBA Draft, who then traded his rights to the Denver Nuggets. It was also announced that he will stay some time overseas before joining the NBA.

Later in the summer of 2013, Lauvergne confirmed that he will stay with the club for another season, despite the financial problems the club was facing. In his second EuroLeague season, with lot of trust from head coach Duško Vujošević, he has made big steps forward in his development, becoming one of the best rebounders in the league averaging 9.3 rebounds in 10 regular season games. His games haven't gone unseen, as Denver Nuggets general manager Tim Connelly has said that they really liked the progress he has made through the season. When team captain Dragan Milosavljević got injured, Lauvergne was appointed as new team captain. This made him first foreign captain in history of the Serbian team. Over 24 games in the EuroLeague, he averaged 11.1 points per game, while also leading the league with 8.6 rebounds per game. Along with his teammate Bogdan Bogdanović, he was selected to the Ideal Team of the 2013–14 ABA League season. Partizan finished season by winning its 13th consecutive title, defeating arch rivals Crvena zvezda by 3–1 in the final series.

Day after leaving Partizan, he left the farewell letter praising his old teammates, coaching staff, fans and Serbian people in general. He also stated that he was feeling like part of family, almost like at home, surrounded with love and care from the people in the club.

Khimki (2014–2015)
On 23 June 2014 he signed a two-year deal with the Russian club Khimki. According to the Serbian daily press Večernje novosti, Partizan also received US$600,000 in the name of buyout from Khimki, as Lauvergne was still under contract with Partizan.

On 4 February 2015 Lauvergne parted ways with Khimki. Over 27 games, he averaged 9.4 points, 4.4 rebounds and 1.1 assists per game.

Denver Nuggets (2015–2016)
On 19 February 2015 Lauvergne signed a reported two-year deal with the Denver Nuggets. Three days later, he made his NBA debut, recording 8 points and 3 rebounds in the Nuggets' 119–94 loss to the Oklahoma City Thunder.

On 19 February 2016 Lauvergne scored a career-high 22 points in the Nuggets' 116–110 loss to the Sacramento Kings.

Oklahoma City Thunder (2016–2017)

On 30 August 2016 Lauvergne was traded to the Oklahoma City Thunder in exchange for two protected 2017 second round draft picks. On 3 February 2017 he scored a season-high 16 points in a 114–102 win over the Memphis Grizzlies.

Chicago Bulls (2017)
On 23 February 2017 Lauvergne was traded, along with Cameron Payne and Anthony Morrow, to the Chicago Bulls in exchange for Taj Gibson, Doug McDermott and a 2018 second-round draft pick.

San Antonio Spurs (2017–2018)
On 18 July 2017 Lauvergne signed with the San Antonio Spurs. On February 13, 2018, he scored a career-high 26 points to go with a season-high 11 rebounds in a 117–109 loss to the Denver Nuggets.

Fenerbahçe (2018–2020)
On 4 July 2018 Lauvergne signed a two-year deal with the Turkish club Fenerbahçe. Lauvergne had 12 points on 4-from-7 shooting, along with 4 rebounds in his EuroLeague debut versus Gran Canaria. Over 22 EuroLeague games during the 2018–2019 season, he averaged 8.5 points, 3.6 rebounds and career-high 1.8 assists per game.

Žalgiris Kaunas (2020–2022)
On 14 July 2020 Lauvergne signed with Žalgiris Kaunas of the Lithuanian Basketball League (LKL). On 28 January 2021 Žalgiris and Lauvergne agreed on a 1+1 extension deal until the end of the 2022–2023 season. On 7 October 2021 Lauvergne suffered a shoulder injury which sidelined him for most of the 2021–2022 season.

ASVEL (2022–present)
On June 30, 2022, he has signed with ASVEL of the French LNB Pro A.

Career statistics

NBA

Regular season

|-
| style="text-align:left;"| 
| style="text-align:left;"| Denver
| 24 || 1 || 11.2 || .404 || .188 || .643 || 3.2 || .5 || .3 || .4 || 3.9
|-
| style="text-align:left;"|
| style="text-align:left;"| Denver
| 59 || 15 || 17.6 || .513 || .245 || .899 || 4.9 || .9 || .2 || .3 || 7.9
|-
| style="text-align:left;"|
| style="text-align:left;"| Oklahoma City
| 50 || 0 || 14.8 || .455 || .346 || .638 || 3.7 || 1.0 || .3 || .1 || 5.7
|-
| style="text-align:left;"|
| style="text-align:left;"| Chicago
| 20 || 1 || 12.1 || .402 || .300 || .600 || 3.4 || 1.0 || .4 || .0 || 4.5
|-
| style="text-align:left;"|
| style="text-align:left;"| San Antonio
| 55 || 1 || 9.7 || .516 || .000 || .638 || 3.1 || .7 || .2 || .1 || 4.1
|- class="sortbottom"
| style="text-align:center;" colspan="2"| Career
| 208 || 18 || 13.6 || .479 || .285 || .719 || 3.8 || .9 || .3 || .2 || 5.6

Playoffs

|-
| style="text-align:left;"|2017
| style="text-align:left;"| Chicago
| 3 || 0 || 8.7 || .364 || .000 || 1.000 || 3.0 || 1.7 || .0 || .0 || 4.7
|-
| style="text-align:left;"|2018
| style="text-align:left;"| San Antonio
| 1 || 0 || 6.0 || 1.000 || – || – || 1.0 || .0 || .0 || .0 || 2.0
|- class="sortbottom"
| style="text-align:center;" colspan="2"| Career
| 4 || 0 || 8.0 || .417 || .000 || 1.000 || 2.5 || 1.3 || .0 || .0 || 4.0

EuroLeague

|-
| style="text-align:left;"| 2012–13
| style="text-align:left;"| Élan Chalon
| 7 || 5 || 15.4 || .531 || .500 || .800 || 3.6 || .9 || .1 || .1 || 6.6 ||6.3
|-
| style="text-align:left;"| 2013–14
| style="text-align:left;"| Partizan
| 24 || 24 || style="background:#CFECEC;"|32.3 || .515 || .229 || .714 || style="background:#CFECEC;"|8.6 || 1.0 || .6 || .3 || 11.1 || 15.4
|-
| style="text-align:left;"| 2018–19
| style="text-align:left;" rowspan=2| Fenerbahçe
| 22 || 4 || 18.0 || .559 || .300 || .514 || 3.6 || 1.8 || .4 || .3 || 8.5 || 10.1
|-
| style="text-align:left;"| 2019–20
| 19 || 9 || 13.9 || .543 || .286 || .441 || 2.7 || .8 || .2 || .2 || 6.3 || 6.6
|-
| style="text-align:left;"| 2020–21
| style="text-align:left;"| Žalgiris
| 32 || 31 || 20.9 || .586 || .400 || .660 || 5.6 || 1.5 || .5 || .1 || 10.7 ||12.0
|- class="sortbottom"
| style="text-align:center;" colspan=2| Career
| 106 || 73 || 20.8 || .555 || .293 || .619 || 5.2 || 1.3 || .4 || .2 || 9.2 || 10.8

National team career

Lauvergne is a member of the senior men's French national basketball team. He won the gold medal with France at the EuroBasket 2013. The following summer, he won the bronze medal with France at the 2014 World Cup. His role in the team increased, and he averaged 9.2 points and 5.3 rebounds over nine tournament games.

International stats

Personal life
Although Lauvergne keeps his personal life out of the public eye, in several interviews he admitted to being married.

He is a big fan of KK Partizan.

On 8 October 2020 Lauvergne was reported to have tested positive for COVID-19. However, after redoing the test twice, it turned out the initial test was a false positive and Lauvergne had not contracted COVID-19.

See also
 List of foreign basketball players in Serbia
 List of NBA drafted players from Serbia

References

External links

Joffrey Lauvergne at aba-liga.com
Joffrey Lauvergne at acb.com
Joffrey Lauvergne at euroleague.net
Joffrey Lauvergne at lnb.fr 
Joffrey Lauvergne at vtb-league.com
Joffrey Lauvergne at tblstat.net

1991 births
Living people
2014 FIBA Basketball World Cup players
ABA League players
ASVEL Basket players
Basketball League of Serbia players
Basketball players at the 2016 Summer Olympics
BC Khimki players
BC Žalgiris players
Centers (basketball)
Centre Fédéral de Basket-ball players
Chicago Bulls players
Denver Nuggets players
Élan Chalon players
Fenerbahçe men's basketball players
FIBA EuroBasket-winning players
French expatriate basketball people in Russia
French expatriate basketball people in Serbia
French expatriate basketball people in Spain
French expatriate basketball people in the United States
French expatriate sportspeople in Lithuania
French expatriate sportspeople in Turkey
French men's basketball players
KK Partizan players
Liga ACB players
Memphis Grizzlies draft picks
National Basketball Association players from France
Oklahoma City Thunder players
Olympic basketball players of France
Power forwards (basketball)
San Antonio Spurs players
Sportspeople from Mulhouse
Valencia Basket players